Kunst is a Dutch, German and Ashkenazic Jewish surname It may be patronymic in origin, meaning Coenraad's, Konrad's or Constant's son. Notable people with the surname include:

Three Dutch Renaissance painter brothers, sons of Cornelis Engebrechtsz
 Pieter Cornelisz Kunst (c.1487–c.1560)
 Cornelis Cornelisz Kunst (1493–1544)
 Lucas Cornelisz Kunst (1495–1552)
 Bob Kunst (born 1941), American human and civil rights activist
 Dave Kunst (born 1939), American who was the first person to officially walk around the earth.
 Fritz Kunst (1899–1979), German politician 
 Gustav Kunst (1836-1905), German (Hamburg) merchant 
 Jaap Kunst (1891–1960), Dutch ethnomusicologist
 Jorrit Kunst (born 1989), Dutch footballer
 Kenny Kunst (born 1986), Curaçaon footballer
  (born 1966), Dutch writer
 Renae Kunst, Australian rugby player
 Sabine Kunst (born 1954), German University President and politician
 Wilhelm Kunst (actor) (1799–1859), German actor
 Wilhelm Kunst (1909–1986), German sculptor

References

See also
Code Kunst, stage name of Jo Sung-woo (born 1989), South Korean rapper and producer

Dutch-language surnames
German-language surnames